The Nicolae Bălcescu Square is a square and junction in Timișoara. It is named after Romanian historian, writer and revolutionary Nicolae Bălcescu (1819–1852). The square is located in the Elisabetin district. Well-known buildings of the square are the Sacred Heart Church, a Roman Catholic church completed in 1919 and the ensemble of the Grigore Moisil Theoretical High School.

During the Austrian Empire, the square was called Grundhausplatz. As a result of the Austro-Hungarian Compromise of 1867, this name was translated into Hungarian: Telekház tér. After the partition of Banat and starting with 1919, the square was renamed Alexandru Lahovary Square, after the name of Foreign Minister Alexandru Lahovary. In 1947, its name was once again changed to Marshal Tito Square, a name it bore for a short time. The square finally got its current name in the early 1950s.

References 

Squares in Timișoara